Matthew Habershon (1789–1852) was an English architect.

Biography
Habershon, born in 1789, came of a Yorkshire family. In 1806 he was articled to the architect William Atkinson, with whom he remained for some years as assistant. He was an occasional exhibitor at the Royal Academy between 1807 and 1827. He designed churches at Belper (1824), Minster, Bishop Ryders (all in Derbyshire), and at Kimberworth, Yorkshire. At Derby he erected the town hall, which later burnt down, the county courts, and the market. Among the many private houses designed by him were Hadsor House, near Droitwich, Worcestershire, for J. Howard Galton (1827).

In 1842 he visited Jerusalem on behalf of the London Society for Promoting Christianity among the Jews, following the dismissal of the architect James Wood Johns, whose project to build an Anglican Cathedral in the city had met with obstruction from the Ottoman authorities. Habershon's final designs for the site took the more diplomatically acceptable form of a chapel attached to a consulate. His building, standing on the foundations laid down by Johns, was completed in 1849, and became known as Christ Church, Jerusalem. On his way home from Jerusalem in 1843, Habershon had an interview with King Frederick William IV of Prussia, who was associated with England in the establishment of the bishopric of Jerusalem, and in the following year the king conferred on him the great gold medal for science and literature, to mark his appreciation of Habershon's work on The Ancient half-timbered Houses of England (1836).

Habershon died in London in 1852, and was buried in Abney Park Cemetery. Two of his sons, William Gillbee and Edward, were architects.

Writings
A Dissertation on the Prophetic Scriptures, chiefly those of a chronological character, showing their aspect on the present times, and on the destinies of the Jewish Nation (1834).
A Guide to the Study of Chronological Prophecy, selected and abridged from … a Dissertation on the Prophetic Scriptures
The Ancient half-timbered Houses of England (1836).
Premillennial Hymns (1836).
'An Epitome of Prophetic Truth, containing a brief Outline of … Prominent Subjects of Prophecy (1841).
An Historical Exposition of the Prophecies of the Revelation of St. John, showing their connection with those of Daniel, and of the Old Testament in general, particularly in their aspect on the present times.
Two remarkable Signs of the Times, viewed in connexion with Prophecy. First, Reasons for believing the Death of the Duke of Orleans to be the first Thunder; second, An Account of the West London Synagogue of British Jews.… Forming an Appendix to the third edition of "A Dissertation on the Prophetic Scriptures (1842).
The Shadows of the Evening; or the Signs of the Lord's speedy Return (1845).

He also wrote a memoir of Charles Daubuz, prefixed to the latter's Symbolical Dictionary (1842).

References

1789 births
1852 deaths
19th-century English architects
Architects from Yorkshire